Julie Hauge Andersson is a Danish former football defender who played for Fortuna Hjørring and Odense BK in the Elitedivisionen. She was a member of the Danish national team for two years, taking part in the 2001 European Championship.

References

1970 births
Living people
Danish women's footballers
Denmark women's international footballers
Women's association football defenders